Ida Bertha Gertrud Schreiter (12 December 1912 – 20 September 1948) was from 1939 to 1945 an Aufseherin (labor department warden) in Ravensbrück concentration camp.

After the Second World War, Schreiter was brought to justice by the British occupation forces in Germany. She was accused of having taken part in the "selections" of prisoners who were subsequently murdered or died as a result of deliberate overwork or neglect. At the Seventh Ravensbrück Trial she was convicted of war crimes and sentenced to death. Schreiter was subsequently hanged on the gallows at Hamelin Prison by British executioner Albert Pierrepoint.<ref name="trans">This article incorporates information from the corresponding article in the German Wikipedia</ref>

External links
 Silke Schäfer: Zum Selbstverständnis von Frauen im Konzentrationslager. Das Lager Ravensbrück.''. Berlin 2002 (Dissertation als PDF-Datei; 741 kB)

References

1912 births
1948 deaths
Holocaust perpetrators in Germany
Female guards in Nazi concentration camps
Hamburg Ravensbrück trials executions
Executed German women
Executed mass murderers